The 1980 Texas A&M Aggies football team represented Texas A&M University in the 1980 NCAA Division I-A football season as a member of the Southwest Conference (SWC). The Aggies were led by head coach Tom Wilson in his third season and finished with a record of four wins and seven losses (4–7 overall, 3–5 in the SWC).

Schedule

Roster

References

Texas AandM
Texas A&M Aggies football seasons
Texas AandM Aggies football